Jerry Dunn may refer to:

 Jerry Dunn (basketball) (born 1953), American basketball coach
 Jerry Dunn (runner) (born 1946), American athlete